Slobodan Nikolić (born June 14, 1959) is a Serbian basketball coach and former player.

Playing career 
Nikolić played for the Crvena zvezda of the Yugoslav First League from 1975 to 1987 and from 1989 to 1991. He holds the Clubs records for the most seasons played (14) and the most games played (429). He also played for the Vojvodina and the OKK Beograd as well as for Bulgarian team Plama Pleven. He retired as a player with Radnički Kragujevac in 1995.

Coaching career 
Nikolić coached teams from Russia (Spartak Primorye), Bulgaria (Lukoil Academic), the Czech Republic (Opava, Synthesia Pardubice), Romania (Energia Rovinari) as well as OKK Beograd, Radnički Zastava and Borac Banja Luka.

Personal life 
He is the father of a Serbian basketball player Stefan Nikolić (born 1987).

See also 
 KK Crvena zvezda accomplishments and records
 List of KK Crvena zvezda players with 100 games played

References

1959 births
Living people
OKK Borac coaches
KK Crvena zvezda players
KK Vojvodina players
OKK Beograd players
KK Radnički Kragujevac (1950–2004) players
KK BASK coaches
OKK Beograd coaches
OKK Konstantin coaches
KK Napredak Aleksinac coaches
KK Radnički KG 06 coaches
People from Zemun
Serbian men's basketball players
Serbian men's basketball coaches
Serbian expatriate basketball people in Bosnia and Herzegovina
Serbian expatriate basketball people in Bulgaria
Serbian expatriate basketball people in China
Serbian expatriate basketball people in Romania
Serbian expatriate basketball people in Russia
Serbian expatriate basketball people in the Czech Republic
Yugoslav men's basketball players
Shooting guards